Joseph Pehrson (August 14, 1950 – April 4, 2020) was an American composer and pianist.

Life 
Pehrson comes from Detroit, Michigan. He studied at the University of Michigan and Eastman School of Music. (D.M.A. 1981). His teachers include Leslie Bassett, Joseph Schwantner, Otto Luening and Elie Siegmeister. From 1992 to 1993 he was composer-in-residence at the University of Akron. Since 1983 he served as co-director of the Composers Concordance in New York City. He mostly wrote pieces for orchestral and chamber music. His compositions have been performed at Merkin Concert Hall, Carnegie Hall and Symphony Space. Concerts were held in  Eastern Europe and Russia. Recently, he was working with the German Ensemble Sortisatio.

Further reading 
 Europa Publications (2003). International Who's Who in Classical Music 2003. London: Routledge. . pp. 602.

References

External links 
 Joseph Pehrson official site

1950 births
Living people
20th-century classical composers
21st-century classical composers
American male classical composers
American classical composers
American classical pianists
Male classical pianists
American male pianists
University of Michigan alumni
Eastman School of Music alumni
Musicians from Detroit
21st-century American composers
20th-century American composers
20th-century American pianists
Classical musicians from Michigan
21st-century classical pianists
20th-century American male musicians
21st-century American male musicians
21st-century American pianists